David Binney (born August 2, 1961) is an American alto saxophonist and composer.

Early life
Binney was born in Miami, Florida, and was raised in Carpinteria, California. From his parents, who loved music, he was exposed to albums by John Coltrane, Miles Davis, Wayne Shorter, and Jimi Hendrix. He took saxophone lessons in Los Angeles.

Career 
When he was nineteen, he moved to New York City and studied with saxophonists George Coleman, Dave Liebman, and Phil Woods. A grant from the National Endowment for the Arts helped him record his first album, Point Game. In the 1990s, he started his own label, Mythology Records.

He has been of several bands, including Lost Tribe, Jagged Sky, Lan Xang, the Gil Evans Orchestra, the Maria Schneider Orchestra, and Medeski Martin & Wood. He has also worked with Adam Rogers, Alex Sipiagin, Ben Monder, Ben Perowsky, Bill Frisell, Bobby Previte, Brian Blade, Cecil McBee, Craig Taborn, David Gilmore, Donny McCaslin, Edward Simon, Eivind Opsvik, Jacob Sacks, James Genus, Jim Black, Jim Hall, Kenny Wollesen, Leni Stern, Lonnie Plaxico, Mark Turner, Marvin "Smitty" Smith, Nate Wood, Scott Colley, Steven Bernstein, Thomas Morgan, Tim Lefebvre, Wayne Krantz.

Discography
 Point Game (Owl, 1990)
 The Luxury of Guessing (AudioQuest, 1995)
 Free to Dream (Mythology, 1998)
 Afinidad with Edward Simon (Red, 2001)
 South (ACT, 2001)
 Balance (ACT, 2002)
 A Small Madness with Jeff Hirshfield (Auand, 2003)
 Welcome to Life (Mythology, 2004)
 Fiestas de Agosto with Edward Simon (Red, 2005)
 Bastion of Sanity (Criss Cross, 2005)
 This Life with Mario Franco (Tone of a Pitch, 2006)
 Cities and Desire (Criss Cross, 2006)
 Out of Airplanes (Mythology, 2006)
 Oceanos with Edward Simon (Criss Cross, 2007)
 In the Paint with Alan Ferber (Posi-Tone, 2009)
 Third Occasion (Mythology, 2009)
 Aliso (Criss Cross, 2010)
 Barefooted Town (Criss Cross, 2011)
 Graylen Epicenter (Mythology, 2011)
 Lifted Land (Criss Cross, 2013)
 Anacapa (Criss Cross, 2014)
 R&B with Adam Rogers (Criss Cross, 2015)
 The Time Verses (Criss Cross, 2017)
 Zinc City with Manuel Engel (Metonic, 2018)

With Lan Xang
 Hidden Gardens (Naxos, 2000)

With Lost Tribe
 Lost Tribe (Windham Hill, 1993)
 Soulfish (High Street, 1994)
 Many Lifetimes (Arabesque, 1998)

As sideman
With Uri Caine
 Urlicht / Primal Light (Winter & Winter, 1997)
 Gustav Mahler in Toblach (Winter & Winter, 1999)

With Scott Colley
 Portable Universe (Free Lance, 1996)
 Architect of the Silent Moment (CAM Jazz, 2007)

With John Escreet
 Consequences (Posi-Tone, 2008)
 Don't Fight the Inevitable (Mythology, 2010)
 Exception to the Rule (Criss Cross, 2011)
 The Age We Live In (Mythology, 2011)
 Sabotage and Celebration (Whirlwind, 2013)

With Joel Harrison
 Free Country (ACT, 2003)
 So Long 2nd Street (ACT, 2004)
 Harbor (HighNote, 2007)
 The Wheel (Intuition, 2008)
 Urban Myths (HighNote, 2009)
 Multiplicity: Leave the Door Open (Whirlwind, 2014)

With Donny McCaslin
 The Way Through (Arabesque, 2003)
 In Pursuit (Sunnyside, 2007)
 Perpetual Motion (Greenleaf, 2010)
 Casting for Gravity (Greenleaf, 2012)
 Fast Future (Greenleaf, 2015)
 Beyond Now (Motema, 2016)

With Miles Okazaki
 Mirror (2006)
 Generations (Sunnyside, 2009)
With Samo Salamon
 Ela's Dream (Splasc(h) Records, 2005)
 Government Cheese (Fresh Sound New Talent, 2006)

With Edward Simon
 La Bikina (Red, 2011)
 Sorrows & Triumphs (Sunnyside, 2018)

With Alex Sipiagin
 Images (TCB, 1998)
 Equilibrium (Criss Cross, 2004)
 Destinations Unknown (Criss Cross, 2011)
 Balance (Criss Cross, 2015)

With others
 Anthony Branker, The Forward (Towards Equality) Suite (Origin, 2014)
 Vinicius Cantuaria, Cymbals (Naive, 2007)
 David Gilmore, Ritualism (Kashka Music 2000)
 Drew Gress, Heyday (Soul Note, 1998)
 Wayne Krantz, Howie 61 (Abstract Logix, 2012)
 Nguyen Le, Songs of Freedom (ACT, 2011)
 Joe Locke, Subtle Disguise (Origin, 2018)
 Medeski Martin & Wood, It's a Jungle in Here (Gramavision, 1993)
 Virgil Moorefield, Distractions on the Way to the King's Party (Cuneiform, 1994)
 Lonnie Plaxico, Short Takes (Muse, 1992)
 Chris Potter, Traveling Mercies (Verve, 2002)
 Antonio Sánchez, New Life (CAM Jazz, 2013)

References

External links
 Official site
 Review of Out of Airplanes
 Review of The Time Verses

Living people
American jazz saxophonists
American male saxophonists
Avant-garde jazz saxophonists
Musicians from Miami
Musicians from New York City
21st-century American saxophonists
21st-century American male musicians
1961 births
American male jazz musicians
Jazzhole members
ACT Music artists
Red Records artists
Criss Cross Jazz artists
Jazz musicians from New York (state)